Dr Shalom Levin (27 March 1916 – 14 April 1995) was an Israeli teacher and politician who served as a member of the Knesset for the Alignment between 1969 and 1977.

Biography
Born in Rakaŭ near Minsk in the Russian Empire (present-day Belarus), Levin studied at the Tarbut Teachers Seminary in Vilnius, and was a member of the Jewish HeHalutz movement in Poland.

In 1937 he made aliyah to Mandatory Palestine. In 1952 he got an MA degree in bible, literature and the history of Israel at the Hebrew University of Jerusalem, earning there a PhD in philosophy of education in 1976. He served as general secretary of the Israel Teachers Union between 1955 and 1980, when he became its president until his death in 1995. Between 1963 and 1968 he also served as president of the International Federation of Teachers' Associations.

A member of the central committee and secretariat of Mapai, he was elected to the Knesset on the Alignment list in  1969, and was re-elected in 1973. He was not included in the Alignment list in the 1977 elections, when the Likud party defeated the Alignment and took over the government, and served as a member of the Histadrut's organising committee between 1977 and 1981.

He died in 1995.

References

External links

1916 births
1995 deaths
People from Valozhyn District
People from Minsky Uyezd
Belarusian Jews
Soviet emigrants to Mandatory Palestine
Jews in Mandatory Palestine
Israeli people of Belarusian-Jewish descent
Mapai politicians
Alignment (Israel) politicians
Israeli trade unionists
Israeli educators
Hebrew University of Jerusalem alumni
Members of the 7th Knesset (1969–1974)
Members of the 8th Knesset (1974–1977)